In particle physics, dimensional transmutation is a physical mechanism providing a linkage between a dimensionless parameter and a dimensionful parameter.

In classical field theory, such as gauge theory in four-dimensional spacetime, the coupling constant is a dimensionless constant. However, upon quantization, logarithmic divergences in one-loop diagrams  of perturbation theory imply that this "constant" actually depends on the typical energy scale of the processes under considerations, called the renormalization group (RG) scale. This "running" of the coupling is specified  by the beta-function of the renormalization group.

Consequently, the interaction may be characterised by a dimensionful parameter , namely the value of the RG scale at which the coupling constant diverges. Perturbation theory, which produced this type of running formula,  is only valid for a (dimensionless) coupling  ≪ 1. In the case of QCD, the energy scale  is an infrared cutoff, such that  implies , with  the RG scale. 

On the other hand, in the case of theories such as QED,  is an ultraviolet cutoff, such that  implies .

This is also a way of saying that the conformal symmetry of the classical theory is anomalously broken upon quantization, thereby setting up a mass scale. See conformal anomaly.

Quantum field theory
Renormalization group